Nali Sopat/Penabu Rural LLG is a local-level government (LLG) of Manus Province, Papua New Guinea.

Wards
01. N'drapitou
02. Soheneriu
03. Kapou
04. Bulihan
05. Karun
06. Sirrah
07. Lawes
08. Nohang
09. Katin
10. Lowaiya
11. Lapap Lahan
12. Maleh
13. M'bunai
14. Pere 1
18. Patusi
19. Pere 2
20. Pachal
21. Machaparloh

References

Local-level governments of Manus Province